2,6-Di-tert-butylphenol is an organic compound with the structural formula 2,6-((CH3)3C)2C6H3OH.  This colorless solid alkylated phenol and its derivatives are used industrially as UV stabilizers and antioxidants for hydrocarbon-based products ranging from petrochemicals to plastics.  Illustrative of its usefulness, it prevents gumming in aviation fuels.

Production
2,6-Di-tert-butylphenol is prepared industrially via the Friedel–Crafts alkylation of phenol with isobutene catalyzed by aluminium phenoxide:
C6H5OH  +  2 CH2=C(CH3)2  →  ((CH3)3C)2C6H3OH

In this way, approximately 2.5M kg/y are produced.

Applications
Its dominant use is as an antioxidant.  

2,6-di-tert-butylphenol is a precursor to more complex compounds used as antioxidants and light-protection agents for the stabilization for polymers. Of particular note is methyl-3-(3,5-di-tert-butyl-4-hydroxyphenyl)-propionate (CAS# 6386-38-5), which is formed by the Michael addition of methyl acrylate. This compound is used as a feedstock in the synthesis of more complex antioxidants such as Irganox 1098. 2,6-Di-tert-butylphenol is also used in the synthesis of CGP-7930, probucol, and nicanartine.

Safety and regulation
The  is 9200 mg/kg, indicating a low toxicity.

2,6-Di-tert-butylphenol is covered by the U.S. Department of Transportation Code of Federal Regulations 49 CFR 172.101, Appendix B (20 Dec 2004). This substance is designated by the U.S. Department of Transportation (DOT) as a marine pollutant.

See also
 Butylated hydroxytoluene
 2,4-Dimethyl-6-tert-butylphenol
 Para tertiary butyl phenol

References

Antioxidants
Alkylphenols
Fuel antioxidants
Tert-butyl compounds